Mastini can refer to:

A.S. Mastini Varese Hockey, an Italian hockey team
Neapolitan Mastiff, a breed of very large dogs

See also
 Mastani